Sinéad Keenan (born 27 December 1977) is an Irish actress with a wide range of television, film and stage credits. Keenan is best known for playing Farrah Phelan in Fair City and for playing the role of werewolf Nina Pickering on BBC Three's supernatural drama Being Human. She has since played DCI Jessica James in ITV1 drama Unforgotten since 2023.

Biography
Keenan was born and raised in Dublin, and is the eldest of three children. Her younger brother and sister, Rory and Grainne, are also actors.

She attended University College Dublin, graduating with a degree in Sociology and History. As a child, Keenan says she wanted to be a lawyer because she loved the US legal drama, Matlock, but as she got older she realised that she actually just wanted to play the part of the lawyer, not be one.

Career
Keenan's first role was in 1999, when she was cast as the teenage girlfriend of Cillian Murphy in the film, Sunburn. After this, she played the character Farrah Phelan in Irish soap opera Fair City for a year. Keenan has stated she would return to Fair City, as another character.

Keenan left Fair City amid fears of becoming type-cast, and moved on to film the movie On the Nose with Cracker actor Robbie Coltrane. Her next television role was as Lisa Cassidy in short-lived Irish sitcom The Cassidys.

Keenan then went on to have guest roles in Murder City, Taggart and Doctors, along with starring in movies Conspiracy of Silence and Trouble with Sex, before landing the role of Kelly Hawkins in ITV's Moving Wallpaper, which ran for two series.

Following this, Keenan played Nina Pickering in Toby Whithouse's Being Human. The actress, and her chemistry with on-screen boyfriend Russell Tovey, was so well liked by Whithouse that he edited the storyline to keep Keenan's character in the show. The character of Nina was retained for the second and third series; in the latter Keenan was upgraded to a main cast member.

Following her success in Being Human, Keenan has had guest roles in Victoria Wood's Mid Life Christmas, Agatha Christie's Poirot, Silent Witness and David Tennant's final episodes of Doctor Who.

Throughout her career, Keenan has had strong roots in theatre becoming a member of the Royal Shakespeare Company (RSC), playing parts such as Hermia in A Midsummer Night's Dream and Evie in the original play, The American Pilot. She also starred in The Comedy of Errors.

In March 2018, Keenan won the Royal Television Society Programme Award for Actor (Female) for her role as Melanie Jones in Little Boy Blue. In April 2018, it was announced that she had been nominated for a Leading Actress BAFTA TV Award for the same role.

Keenan had a starring role in the Jimmy McGovern and Gillian Juckes drama Care, shown on BBC One on 9 December 2018.

In April 2021, it was announced that Keenan would be starring in the two-part BBC One drama Three Families, which will focus on abortion in Northern Ireland. It was filmed in Northern Ireland in 2020.

In March 2022, it was announced that Keenan would be appearing in series 5 of ITV's crime drama Unforgotten as DCI Jessica James.

Personal life
In 2012, she married to film and tv director Chris McGill, founder at Dusthouse Productions, with whom she has two sons.

Filmography

Television

Personal appearances

Film

Radio and CD audio drama

Theatre

Awards and nominations

References

External links
 
 

1977 births
Living people
Actresses from Dublin (city)
Alumni of University College Dublin
Irish film actresses
Irish radio actresses
Irish Shakespearean actresses
Irish soap opera actresses
Irish stage actresses
Irish television actresses
Irish voice actresses
Royal Shakespeare Company members
20th-century Irish actresses
21st-century Irish actresses